Kimberley is a town and civil parish in the Borough of Broxtowe in Nottinghamshire, England, lying 6 miles northwest of Nottingham along the A610. The town grew as a centre for coal mining, brewing and hosiery manufacturing.  Together with the neighbouring villages of Giltbrook, Greasley and Swingate it as a population of around 6,500 people. At the 2011 Census the appropriate ward was Cossall and Kimberley. This had a population of 6,659.
In an estimate for mid-year 2019, it estimated for the Kimberley ward a population of 6,890.

History
Kimberley is referred to as Chinemarelie in William the Conqueror's Domesday Book. With the accession of William to the throne Kimberley came into the possession of William de Peveril. The Peverils lost control when they supported the losing side in the civil war which preceded the accession of Henry II of England in 1154. The King became the owner of the land. King John of England granted land in the area to Ralph de Greasley in 1212 who took up residence at Greasley Castle and also at around this time to Henry de Grey whose son re-built Codnor Castle on the site of an earlier castle established by William Peveril.

Ralph de Greasley's land passed by inheritance and marriage to Nicholas de Cantelupe who took part in Edward III of England's Scottish campaigns and also the Battle of Crécy. Nicholas founded Beauvale Priory using part of his Kimberley holding in 1343. That part of Kimberley which had become the property of Beauvale Priory was claimed by King Henry VIII during the Dissolution of the Monasteries in the 16th century.

The Priory's land was redistributed by the King and came into the possession of Arthur Capell, 1st Baron Capell of Hadham again by inheritance and marriage in 1627. Arthur was beheaded in 1649 having fought for the Royalists in the English Civil War. Arthur's son was created Earl of Essex in 1661.

In 1753 the land was purchased by Sir Matthew Lamb whose grandson William Lamb became Prime Minister in 1834. The Lamb's Kimberley estates passed by marriage to the 5th Earl Cowper in 1805 and on the death of the 7th Earl in 1913 were sold off in pieces.

That part of Kimberley retained by the Cantelupe's passed by inheritance and marriage to John Lord Zouch who died at the Battle of Bosworth with Richard III in 1485. He was posthumously found guilty of high treason with his property forfeited to Henry VII. John Savage (-1491) received this part of Kimberley in gratitude for his efforts on behalf of Henry VII at Bosworth. The Savage family sold this land to the Earl of Rutland in the early 17th century. The Duke of Rutland's Kimberley estates were sold in parcels in the early 19th century.

Industry
Kimberley has been home to a lot of industry including: coal mining, brewing and hosiery manufacturing.

All major industry in Kimberley has stopped, the last being Kimberley Brewery which ceased brewing in December 2006. Most businesses are now retail-based concerns.

Kimberley today

One of Kimberley's most notable structures is its unusual war memorial, in the form of a rotunda which is used as the emblem of Kimberley School. This secondary school has a catchment area which extends into the neighbouring areas of Nuthall, Eastwood, Watnall, and Hempshill Vale.

On the South side of Kimberley lies Swingate, which has many different walking and cycling routes into the woods and surrounding countryside.

The twin towns of Kimberley are Échirolles in France and Grugliasco in Italy.

Kimberley Brewery was taken over by Greene King in 2006, another major brewer in a multimillion-pound deal which marked the end of the traditional Kimberley Ales as ale brewing ceased shortly afterwards and only a distribution centre remained there.

The former Kimberley Brewery site has within its boundaries a geological Site of Special Scientific Interest (SSSI). It is listed under the title of "Kimberley Railway Cutting" as an important location for Permian Gymnosperm fossils. The Permian - Carboniferous unconformity can be found in the Kimberley Railway Cutting.

Since 1974, Kimberley forms part of the borough of Broxtowe.  From 1894 to 1974 it was part of Basford Rural District Council area.

There has been speculation that the Nottingham Express Transit (NET) want to extend their tram line that currently terminates at Phoenix Park stop through Kimberley towards Giltbrook Retail Park.

Famous residents
William Bryan (1856–1933), first-class cricketer
John Reynolds was British Superbike Champion, 1992, 2001 and 2004
Sergeant Richard Bolitho was the Rear Gunner on a Lancaster bomber which crashed with the loss of the whole crew during the Dambuster raid in World War II.

Sport

 Kimberley Town F.C. were the main local football team until they folded in 2012.
 Kimberley Miners Welfare F.C.
 Kimberley Institute Cricket Club is the town's cricket team.
Awsworth - Kimberley & District Rifle Club
 Kimberley & District Striders Running Club

See also
 Murder of Barbara Mayo, infamous unsolved killing of a woman who was apparently abducted from Kimberley in 1970
 Kimberley West railway station
 Kimberley East railway station
 Watnall railway station
 Kimberley Brewery
 Kimberley Town Council http://www.kimberley-tc.gov.uk/

References

Further reading

External links
 
Kimberley Railway Cutting photos

Towns in Nottinghamshire
Places in the Borough of Broxtowe
Civil parishes in Nottinghamshire